Nipa-Kutubu District is a district of the Southern Highlands Province of Papua New Guinea.  Its capital is Nipa.  The population was 147,005 at the 2011 census.

References

Districts of Papua New Guinea
Southern Highlands Province